Everett Nunatak is a massive rock nunatak standing just northeast of the Roberts Massif, at the southwest side of Zaneveld Glacier. It was named by the Texas Tech Shackleton Glacier Expedition (1964–65) for James R. Everett, a graduate student at Texas Technological College, who was a member of the expedition who first explored the feature.

References 

Nunataks of the Ross Dependency
Dufek Coast